This is a list of presidents of Southern University and A&M College in Baton Rouge, Louisiana. It was designated as a land grant college in 1890, to serve black students in the state. It added Agricultural and Mechanical College to its title. In 1914 it relocated to Scotlandville, Louisiana in East Baton Rouge Parish, where the state had bought several hundred acres to support the new campus and its agricultural program.

References

Southern University
Southern